Sameera Sherief is an Indian television actress and producer who acted in Bharayamani serial and serials like Prathibimbam, Mangamma Gari Manavaralu and played the lead role in the Tamil serials like Pagal Nilavu in 2016 and Rekka Katti Parakkudhu Manasu in 2018. She married her Pagal Nilavu co-star Syed Anwar in 2019. The couple have a son born on 4 September 2021 named as Arhaan She started her acting career at the age of 15 with the Telugu TV serial Aadapillain 2006. She won Vijay Television Awards for Favourite Find for Pagal Nilavu.

Television

References

External links

1991 births
Living people
Indian television actresses
Actresses in Telugu television